Samuel Lameko Panapa is a New Zealand former professional rugby league footballer who played in the 1980s and 1990s. He represented three countries in his career: Tokelau, New Zealand and Western Samoa. Panapa played his club football in Auckland as well as England, where he won several titles with the champion Wigan side of the 1990s.

Playing career
A Ponsonby Pony Junior and Ponsonby-Maritime Senior from 1969 - 1982, joined Glenora Bears in 1983 for two season before signing an off-season contract with UK Club Sheffield Eagles 1984–5. Returning to NZ in 1985 signed with Te Atatu Roosters in the Auckland Rugby League competitions, Panapa played club football in Britain for Wigan. He represented Tokelau at the 1986 Pacific Cup, and later for New Zealand.
During the 1991–92 Rugby Football League season, Panapa played for defending champions Wigan at centre in their 1991 World Club Challenge victory against the visiting Penrith Panthers, scoring his first try for the club. During the 1992–93 Rugby Football League season Panapa played from the interchange bench for defending RFL champions Wigan in the 1992 World Club Challenge defeat by the visiting Brisbane Broncos.

Sam Panapa played as an Interchange/Substitute, i.e. number 15, (replacing  Phil Clarke on 9-minutes) in Wigan's 15–8 victory over Bradford Northern in the 1992–93 Regal Trophy Final during the 1992–93 season at Elland Road, Leeds on Saturday 23 January 1993, and played as an Interchange/Substitute, i.e. number 14, (replacing  Neil Cowie on 30-minutes) in  the 2–33 defeat by Castleford in the 1993–94 Regal Trophy Final during the 1993–94 season at Elland Road, Leeds on Saturday 22 January 1994.

He played as substitute in both the 1993 and 1994 Challenge Cup finals victories against Widnes and Leeds at Wembley Stadium, scoring a try in each final. After the 1993–94 Rugby Football League season Panapa travelled with defending champions Wigan to Brisbane, playing at centre in their 1994 World Club Challenge victory over Australian premiers, the Brisbane Broncos.

Sam joined Salford in 1994–95 Rugby Football League season, and helped them attain Super League status following a Grand Final victory over Keighley Cougars at Old Trafford. Following that game Sam announced his retirement and returned to Auckland Warriors as Fitness Coach.

He played for Western Samoa at the 1995 Rugby League World Cup.

Coaching career
Between 2006 and 2008 Panapa coached the Auckland side. In 2006 he was the Assistant Coach for the New Zealand Residents team.

References

External links
World Cup 1995 details
Sam Panapa on the Wigan RL Fansite.

Living people
Auckland rugby league team coaches
Auckland rugby league team players
Expatriate rugby league players in England
New Zealand expatriate rugby league players
New Zealand expatriate sportspeople in England
New Zealand national rugby league team players
New Zealand sportspeople of Samoan descent
New Zealand people of Tokelauan descent
New Zealand rugby league coaches
New Zealand rugby league players
Richmond Bulldogs players
Rugby league five-eighths
Rugby league wingers
Salford Red Devils players
Samoa national rugby league team players
Sheffield Eagles (1984) players
Te Atatu Roosters players
Tokelau national rugby league team players
Wigan Warriors players
1963 births